is a retired judoka from Japan.

Overviews 

Mizoguchi claimed the silver medal in the Women's Half-Lightweight (– 52 kg) division at the 1992 Summer Olympics in Barcelona, Spain. In the final she was defeated by Spain's Almudena Muñoz. She also competed at the 1996 Summer Olympics in Atlanta, United States.

References

sports-reference

1971 births
Living people
Japanese female judoka
Judoka at the 1992 Summer Olympics
Judoka at the 1996 Summer Olympics
Olympic judoka of Japan
Olympic silver medalists for Japan
People from Shizuoka (city)
Olympic medalists in judo
Medalists at the 1992 Summer Olympics
20th-century Japanese women
21st-century Japanese women